Javianne Oliver (born December 26, 1994) is an American female track and field sprinter.

Oliver finished second in the 60 meters at the 2017 NCAA Division I Indoor Track and Field Championships for the University of Kentucky.

Oliver won the 60 meters at the 2018 USA Indoor Track and Field Championships to qualify for the 2018 IAAF World Indoor Championships.  Her time of 7.02 was the top time that season in the world.  She returned to the 2020 USA Track & Field Indoor Championships to finish second to Mikiah Brisco, qualifying to her second World Championships in the process. Oliver also won the 2020 US Olympic Trials with a time of 10.99.

Professional
Oliver signed with Nike, Inc in 2018 after winning US 60 meters title.

Major competitions

References

External links
 
 
 Javianne Oliver Monroe Area High School Results Athletic.net
 Javianne Oliver University of Kentucky Results TFRRS.org

Living people
American female sprinters
African-American female track and field athletes
Kentucky Wildcats women's track and field athletes
1994 births
USA Indoor Track and Field Championships winners
21st-century African-American women
21st-century African-American sportspeople
Athletes (track and field) at the 2020 Summer Olympics
Medalists at the 2020 Summer Olympics
Olympic silver medalists for the United States in track and field
Olympic female sprinters